"The Words I Would Say" is a song from These Simple Truths, the first studio album from Sidewalk Prophets.

Premise 

According to lead vocalist Dave Frey, God would bring the notion of a companion or relative to his mind.  Frey then felt the need to literally write that person a letter.  Parts of the chorus made their way into those letters, whose song could be about a parent writing to their son or daughter who has departed, an engaged person writing to their fiancée, or simply an individual addressing their friend.  The song was designed to help people remember to tell someone in their life how much they are cared for by the composer and from the deity himself, and to inspire more such "compositions".

Charts 
The song topped the Billboard's AC/Indicator Chart for 5 weeks in a row.

Certifications

References 

2009 songs
2009 debut singles
Songs written by Sam Mizell